Murphy Wall is a series of north–south trending peaks, the highest 905 m, resembling a wall along the west side of Grace Glacier on the north side of South Georgia. Surveyed by the South Georgia Survey in the period 1951–57, and named by the United Kingdom Antarctic Place-Names Committee (UK-APC) for Robert Cushman Murphy, American ornithologist who made observations and collections in the Bay of Isles in 1912-13 for the American Museum of Natural History, New York City.

Mountains and hills of South Georgia